Ben Jacobs (born 7 June 1974), more commonly known by the stage name Max Tundra, is an English multi-instrumental musician, singer and music producer. His work is noted for its maximalist approach, which is predominantly electronic music but incorporates non-electronic styles and instruments. Jacobs' production style has been noted as an influence on the hyperpop style which became prevalent in the 2010s onwards.

Other than his full-length albums, he has also done remix work for bands of varying genres including Franz Ferdinand, Architecture in Helsinki, Kid606 and the Pet Shop Boys. In 2018, Tundra wrote and produced the comeback album by Daphne and Celeste, entitled Daphne & Celeste Save the World.

Biography
Ben Jacobs was born in Camberwell, London, and is the son of Gerald Jacobs, literary editor of The Jewish Chronicle. Jacobs grew up taking piano lessons, but mostly enjoyed playing television theme songs and music from adverts. As a teenager, he bought a Commodore Amiga 500 with his bar mitzvah money and began exploring electronic music with it. Jacobs began sending demos out to labels. Warp Records received one song he recorded titled "Children at Play" and released it as a single in 1998. Following this single his debut album Some Best Friend You Turned Out to Be was released by Domino Records in the UK in 2000.

The instrumental record was followed up with Mastered by Guy at the Exchange, his first to use vocals. Max Tundra explained "When I was writing Some Best Friend, I thought of all sorts of weird and wonderful machines and instruments I could use to make noises, but singing never occurred to me. I had never considered using my voice on any Max Tundra record ever, but hey, I like to keep things varied, so this time round I figured what the hell!" Mastered By Guy at the Exchange received positive reviews, including being named the 12th top album of the year on Pitchfork Media's list of top 50 albums of 2002.

In 2006, Max Tundra released a new single as part of Tomlab records "Alphabet Series" for the Letter M. The single included a cover of The KLF's "What Time Is Love?", made with his Amiga in 1989. In 2008, Max Tundra toured the UK with Hot Chip and released the album Parallax Error Beheads You which he had worked on for six years. The first single from the album was "Will Get Fooled Again" and was released on 29 September 2008.

On 5 June 2010, Max Tundra effectively announced on Twitter that Parallax Error Beheads You would be the final Max Tundra album. However, in a radio interview from May 2011, he mentioned that he was only taking a break in order to focus on his remix and production work. On 30 March 2012, he claimed on Twitter that he had begun working on a new Max Tundra album.

In 2011, Max Tundra contacted pop duo Daphne and Celeste through social media to offer his production to make a comeback. A single for their song "You and I Alone" was released in 2015, written and produced by Max Tundra. Three years later, Max Tundra announced a full-length studio album he had produced for Daphne and Celeste set for release as Daphne & Celeste Save the World on 30 March through Max Tundra's Balatonic label.

In July 2022, Max Tundra resurfaced with Remixtape, an EP composed of remixes and cover versions contributed by artists such as A.G. Cook, Kero Kero Bonito, Katie Dey, Julia Holter and Tundra himself, released to coinicide with all three Max Tundra albums being remastered on coloured vinyl. Tundra also contributed an original track, "Long-Tail Limbo", for the video game Trombone Champ.

Musical style 
Max Tundra has been noted for his maximalist approach to composition and music production, often incorporating complex chord structures, experimental recording techniques, and a diverse range of instrumentation, many of which he has taught himself how to play. Whilst primilarly noted as an electronic artist, Tundra's music draws influence from a wide range of musical styles, including jazz, progressive rock, folk, indie rock, classical, R&B, UK garage, house, show tunes, chiptune, glitch, and musique concrete, often criss-crossing within songs. The density of his work has been considered a predecessor to the hyperpop scene, though Jacobs claims that he never set out to make a "proto-hyperpop LP", and that his music reflects more of an "eclectic sprawl of genre-free pop".

In 2021, Jacobs stated that "At the start of my career I decided I wanted to invent a new style of music with each song. I'm not sure I always achieved that, but I'm proud of how stylistically varied the three Max Tundra albums are. On the first LP (Some Best Friend You Turned Out To Be) it really was an everything-but-the-kitchen-sink multi-instrumental approach, trying to create music that didn't sound like anything else out of mbires, melodicas and mallets. As the albums progressed, this approach transformed into a kind of "mutated pop" aesthetic, where I would take at least the raw materials of existing genres and remould them into new shapes. Each LP is more electronic than its predecessor, as I dropped traditional instruments in favour of more purely synthetic sounds".

Discography

Albums
{|class="wikitable"
! width="33"|Year
! width="260"|Title
|-
|align="center"|2000
|Some Best Friend You Turned Out to Be
Released: 25 April 2000
Label: Domino
Formats: CD, LP
|-
|align="right"|2002
|Mastered by Guy at the Exchange
Released: 2 September 2002
Label: Domino / Tigerbeat6
Formats: CD, LP
|-
|align="right"|2008
|Parallax Error Beheads You
Released: 20 October 2008
Label: Domino
Formats: CD, LP
|-
|}

Singles
{| class="wikitable"
! width="33"|Year
! width="215"|Title
! width="240"|Album
! width="60"|Label
|-
|align="center"| 1998
| "Children at Play"
| non-album single.
| Warp
|-
|align="center" rowspan="2"|2000
| "Cakes"
| rowspan="2"| Some Best Friend You Turned Out to Be
| rowspan="5"| Domino
|-
| "Ink Me"
|-
| align="center" |2001
| "QY20 Songs"
| non-album single
|-
| align="center" |2002
| "Lysine"
| rowspan="2"|Mastered By Guy at the Exchange
|-
| align="center" |2003
| "Cabasa"
|-
| align="center" |2006
| "Alphabet Series: M"
| non-album single
| Tomlab
|-
| align="center" |2008
| "Will Get Fooled Again"
| Parallax Error Beheads You
| Domino
|-
| align="center" |2020
| "Pets" (featuring David Liebe Hart)
| non-album single
| David Liebe Hart Ministries
|}

Remixes
{|class="wikitable"
! width="33"|Year
! width="215"|Remixed track
! width="230"|Released on
! width="150"|Artist(s)
|-
|align="center"| 1998
|"Helicon 2"
|Kicking a Dead Pig: Mogwai Songs Remixed
|Mogwai
|-
|align="center" rowspan="2"| 2000
|"Dandy"
|Kid 606 and Friends Volume 1
|Kid606
|-
|"Wow"
|"Wow"
|Janek Schaefer
|-
| 2001
|"Lilypad"
|Altered and Proud
|Ruby
|-
|align="center" rowspan="2"| 2002
|"Long Distance"
|"Long Distance"
|Turin Brakes
|-
|"Whindie"
|Whindie
|Ambulance
|-
|align="center" rowspan="3"| 2004
|"Alone, Together"
|"All Hail The Black Emperor"
|The Strokes
|-
|"The Owls Go"
|A Commemorative Keepsake
|Architecture in Helsinki
|-
|"Mein Nehi Jana"
|"Mein Nehi Jana"
|Future Pilot AKA
|-
|align="center" rowspan="2"| 2005
|"Decent Days and Nights"
|"Decent Days and Nights"
|The Futureheads
|-
|"The Effect on Me"
|"The Effect on Me"
|Mint Royale
|-
|align="center" rowspan="2"| 2006
|"Do You Want To"
|"The Fallen"
|Franz Ferdinand
|-
|"I'm with Stupid"
|"I'm with Stupid"
|Pet Shop Boys
|-
|align="center" rowspan="3"| 2007
|"Fledermaus Can't Get It"
|"Fledermaus Can't Get It"
|Von Südenfed
|-
|"Hold Music"
|Like It or Not
|Architecture in Helsinki
|-
|"Bullets"
|"Bullets"
|Tunng
|-
|align="center"| 2008
|"Enough About Human Rights"
|(forthcoming)
|Moondog
|-
|align="center"| 2021
|"Soft Landing"
|Apple vs. 7G
|A. G. Cook
|-
|}

Other appearances
{|class="wikitable"
! width="33"|Year
! width="230"|Title
! width="230"|Appears on
! width="60"|Label
|-
|align="center"| 2000
|"Commando (Defghi Otto)" (The Monsoon Bassoon cover)
|Wall of Suss #2 (split 7-inch with The Monsoon Bassoon)
|Weird Neighbourhood
|-
|align="center"| 2000
|"Coppice Lament"
|No Division
|Mind Horizon
|-
|align="center"| 2000
|"Five Minutes, Five Seconds" (Kid606 vs. Max Tundra)
|Kid606 and Friends Vol. 1
|Tigerbeat6
|-
|align="center"| 2001
|"Runaround"
|Fresh Fruit
|Lo Recordings
|-
|align="center"| 2001
|"Typify Dialup Toll Amateurishness (Fuck Coldplay)"
|Freakbitchlickfly
|Violent Turd
|-
|align="center"| 2001
|"The Bill" (cover of "Overkill" by Andy Pask and Charlie Morgan)
|Tigerbeat6 Inc.
|Tigerbeat6
|-
|align="center"| 2002
|"Theme From "My Place In the Universe""
|TARPOP1
|Tar100mg
|-
|align="center"| 2002
|"Life In a Lift Shaft"
|House of Stairs Vol 1: Useless In Bed
|House of Stairs
|-
|align="center"| 2007
|"A Truce"
|David Shrigley's Worried Noodles
|Tomlab
|-
|align="center"| 2009
|"Playboy" (Hot Chip cover)
|Blood on the Tracks
|Domino
|-
|align="center"| 2010
|"Will Bleed Amen" (featuring Sarah Measures) (Cardiacs cover)
|Leader of the Starry Skies: A Tribute to Tim Smith, Songbook 1
|Believers Roast
|-
|align="center"| 2013
|"Fold 11"
|The Exquisite Corpse Game
|Believers Roast
|-
|align="center"| 2021
|"Rubberneck" (featuring Arca)
|Kick III
|XL
|-
|align="center"| 2022
|"Long-Tail Limbo"
|Wow I Might Refer To This As Tooting: The Trombone Champ Soundtrack Collection Vol. 1
|Holy Wow
|-
|}

Notes

External links
 Official site
 Max Tundra at Domino Recording Company
The Thing Is..., 5 Tunes You Should Have Heard – Max Tundra (September 12, 2007).
 Max Tundra at Pitchfork.com

Living people
English record producers
Jewish English musicians
1974 births
Braindance musicians
English electronic musicians
Intelligent dance musicians
English experimental musicians
English multi-instrumentalists
Warp (record label) artists
Tracker musicians
Domino Recording Company artists